The following is a chronological table of Philippine presidential elections by province, and in some instances, by cities. The presidential election is a direct election by popular vote, where the winner with the most votes wins; there is no runoff.

Key

President

Vice-President

Chronological

For President

Notes

 In 1949, two candidates from the Liberal Party contested the election: Jose Avelino and Elpidio Quirino. Avelino did not win at least a plurality of votes in a single province except his home province of Samar.
 In 1946, two candidates from the Nacionalista Party contested the election: Sergio Osmeña and Manuel Roxas. Both candidates won a plurality votes in more than one province.
 Prior to 1969, Agusan del Norte and Agusan del Sur were part of the province of Agusan. Agusan was split into two provinces on 1967.
 In 1966, the Mountain Province is divided into Kalinga-Apayao, Benguet, Ifugao and a smaller Mountain Province. Kalinga-Apayao was separated in 1995 as Kalinga and Apayao.
 Named after the wife of Philippine President Manuel Luis Quezon, Maria Aurora Aragon-Quezon, the province was separated from the province of Quezon on August 13, 1979. Prior to that, it became a sub-province of Quezon after Aurora's death in 1951.
 On April 8, 1959, Republic Act No. 2141 was signed into law effectively making Biliran a sub-province of Leyte. The island was only made an independent province on May 11, 1992 by virtue of Republic Act No. 7160.
 Prior to 1969, Camiguin is a sub-province under the jurisdiction of Misamis Oriental. It became an independent province on June 18, 1966.
 The eastern part of Davao del Norte on January 30, 1998 as the province of Compostela Valley by virtue of Republic Act No. 8470.
 The present-day Davao Region used to be a whole province simply known as Davao. This original province was split into three: Davao del Norte, Davao Oriental, and Davao del Sur when Republic Act No. 4867.
 The province of Dinagat Islands had been a part of the First District of Surigao del Norte until becoming a province on its own on December 2, 2006. On February 11, 2010, the Supreme Court of the Philippines declared the creation of Dinagat Islands null and void on grounds of failure to meet land area and population requirements for the creation of local government units. Dinagat Islands then reverted to Surigao del Norte. On March 30, 2011, however, the Supreme Court reversed its ruling from the previous year, and upheld the constitutionality of RA 9355 and the creation of Dinagat Islands as a province.
 On June 19, 1965 the Philippine Congress approved Republic Act No. 4221 dividing the province of Samar into three provinces: Northern Samar, Eastern Samar, and Western Samar. On June 21, 1969, Western Samar was renamed Samar.
 Guimaras first gained its status as a sub-province of Iloilo by virtue of R.A. 4667, which was enacted by Congress on 18 June 1966. It was proclaimed as a regular and full-fledged province on 22 May 1992 after a plebiscite was conducted to ratify the approval of its conversion.
 The province of Lanao was divided into Lanao del Norte and Lanao del Sur through Republic Act No. 2228 on May 22, 1959.
 The former province of Cotabato was once the largest in the Philippines. In 1966, South Cotabato was created as a separate province. On November 22, 1973, by virtue of Presidential Decree No. 341, what remained of the old Cotabato was further divided into the provinces of North Cotabato, Maguindanao, and Sultan Kudarat. North Cotabato was later renamed Cotabato through Batas Pambansa Blg. 660[3] approved on December 19, 1983.
 Prior to 1981, only includes results from the City of Manila. Metro Manila was created in 1975, prior to that almost all of Manila was a part of Rizal, with Valenzuela a part of Bulacan, with the city of Manila independent.
 Quirino province acquired its juridical personality as a result of the division of the provinces of Nueva Vizcaya and Isabela on June 18, 1966 under RA 4734. Quirino, named after the late president Elpidio Quirino, was created as a sub-province of Nueva Vizcaya in 1966. It became a full province in 1971.
 The province of Davao Occidental was created from the comprising five of the eight municipalities that constitute the 2nd district of Davao del Sur by the virtue of RA No. 10360 was signed by President Benigno Aquino III on January 14, 2013. Following the passage of the said charter province, a plebiscite was held on October 28, 2013, coinciding with the Barangay elections were held on the said date; and the majority of the votes cast by votes were "Yes", ratifying the province, while "No" is the very few number of voters' cast, about on opposing the said creation.

For Vice-President

Notes

 In 1949, two candidates from the Liberal Party contested the election: Jose Avelino with Vicente Francisco and Elpidio Quirino with Fernando Lopez. Avelino and Francisco did not win at least a plurality of votes in a single province except Avelino's home province of Samar.
 In 1946, two candidates from the Nacionalista Party contested the election: Sergio Osmeña and Manuel Roxas. Both candidates won a plurality votes in more than one province.
 Prior to 1969, Agusan del Norte and Agusan del Sur were part of the province of Agusan. Agusan was split into two provinces on 1967.
 In 1966, the Mountain Province is divided into Kalinga-Apayao, Benguet, Ifugao and a smaller Mountain Province. Kalinga-Apayao was separated in 1995 as Kalinga and Apayao.
 Named after the wife of Philippine President Manuel Luis Quezon, Maria Aurora Aragon-Quezon, the province was separated from the province of Quezon on August 13, 1979. Prior to that, it became a sub-province of Quezon after Aurora's death in 1951.
 On April 8, 1959, Republic Act No. 2141 was signed into law effectively making Biliran a sub-province of Leyte. The island was only made an independent province on May 11, 1992 by virtue of Republic Act No. 7160.
 Prior to 1969, Camiguin is a sub-province under the jurisdiction of Misamis Oriental. It became an independent province on June 18, 1966.
 The eastern part of Davao del Norte on January 30, 1998 as the province of Compostela Valley by virtue of Republic Act No. 8470.
 The present-day Davao Region used to be a whole province simply known as Davao. This original province was split into three: Davao del Norte, Davao Oriental, and Davao del Sur when Republic Act No. 4867.
 The province of Dinagat Islands had been a part of the First District of Surigao del Norte until becoming a province on its own on December 2, 2006. On February 11, 2010, the Supreme Court of the Philippines declared the creation of Dinagat Islands null and void on grounds of failure to meet land area and population requirements for the creation of local government units. Dinagat Islands then reverted to Surigao del Norte. On March 30, 2011, however, the Supreme Court reversed its ruling from the previous year, and upheld the constitutionality of RA 9355 and the creation of Dinagat Islands as a province.
 On June 19, 1965 the Philippine Congress approved Republic Act No. 4221 dividing the province of Samar into three provinces: Northern Samar, Eastern Samar, and Western Samar. On June 21, 1969, Western Samar was renamed Samar.
 Guimaras first gained its status as a sub-province of Iloilo by virtue of R.A. 4667, which was enacted by Congress on 18 June 1966. It was proclaimed as a regular and full-fledged province on 22 May 1992 after a plebiscite was conducted to ratify the approval of its conversion.
 The province of Lanao was divided into Lanao del Norte and Lanao del Sur through Republic Act No. 2228 on May 22, 1959.
 The former province of Cotabato was once the largest in the Philippines. In 1966, South Cotabato was created as a separate province. On November 22, 1973, by virtue of Presidential Decree No. 341, what remained of the old Cotabato was further divided into the provinces of North Cotabato, Maguindanao, and Sultan Kudarat. North Cotabato was later renamed Cotabato through Batas Pambansa Blg. 660[3] approved on December 19, 1983.
 Prior to 1981, only includes results from the City of Manila. Metro Manila was created in 1975, prior to that almost all of Manila was a part of Rizal, with Valenzuela a part of Bulacan, with the city of Manila independent.
 Quirino province acquired its juridical personality as a result of the division of the provinces of Nueva Vizcaya and Isabela on June 18, 1966 under RA 4734. Quirino, named after the late president Elpidio Quirino, was created as a sub-province of Nueva Vizcaya in 1966. It became a full province in 1971.
 The province of Davao Occidental was created from the comprising five of the eight municipalities that constitute the 2nd district of Davao del Sur by the virtue of RA No. 10360 was signed by President Benigno Aquino III on January 14, 2013. Following the passage of the said charter province, a plebiscite was held on October 28, 2013, coinciding with the Barangay elections were held on the said date; and the majority of the votes cast by votes were "Yes", ratifying the province, while "No" is the very few number of voters' cast, about on opposing the said creation.

References

 

Results by province
Presidential election results by province